Ahmed Mohamed Diriye is a Somalilander politician and the current Minister of Education and Science of Somaliland since December 1, 2019.

See also

 Ministry of Education (Somaliland)
 Politics of Somaliland
 List of Somaliland politicians

References

Peace, Unity, and Development Party politicians
Government ministers of Somaliland
Education Ministers of Somaliland
Living people
Year of birth missing (living people)